Gironville-sur-Essonne (literally Gironville on Essonne) is a commune in the Essonne department in Île-de-France in northern France.

Inhabitants of Gironville-sur-Essonne are known as Gironvillois.

See also
Communes of the Essonne department

References

External links

Official website  

Mayors of Essonne Association 

Communes of Essonne